Edscottite is an iron carbide mineral, with the formula Fe5C2. It was previously known to occur during iron smelting, but in 2019 was identified as occurring in nature, but not naturally occurring on earth, when it was discovered in a meteorite.

The source, the Wedderburn meteorite, was found in 1951 just outside Wedderburn in Australia, and is held in the Museums Victoria collection.

During a re-investigation of a section of the meteorite housed at the University of California, Los Angeles, Chi Ma and Alan Rubin verified the presence of a new mineral. They named it edscottite in honor of Edward (Ed) R. D. Scott of the University of Hawaii, USA, a pioneering cosmochemist.

Further reading
2008 Leonard Medal for Edward R. D. Scott, biographical information, https://onlinelibrary.wiley.com/doi/epdf/10.1111/j.1945-5100.2008.tb00706.x

List of Scott's work compiled by ResearchGate, https://www.researchgate.net/scientific-contributions/2132315612_Edward_R_D_Scott

References 

Iron minerals
Carbide minerals
Meteorite minerals